Nas (born 1973) is the stage name of American rapper Nasir Jones.

Nas, NaS, or NAS may also refer to:

Aviation
 Nasair, a low-cost airline carrier and subsidiary based in Eritrea
 National Air Services, an airline in Saudi Arabia
 Nas Air (Saudi Arabia), a low-cost airline carrier and subsidiary of National Air Services
 National Airports System, an organization system of larger or important airports in Canada
 National Airspace System, an aviation control system in the United States
 Naval air squadron, an aircraft-focused unit associated with a navy
 Naval air station, a military air base associated with a navy
 Norwegian Air Shuttle, an airline in Norway
 National Aviation Services, an aviation services provider headquartered in Kuwait

Commerce
 Nihon Ad Systems, a Japanese anime company
 No age statement, for a Scotch whisky

Organizations
 Nationaal Arbeids-Secretariaat, a trade union federation in the Netherlands 1893-1940
 National Academy of Songwriters
 National Academy of Sports (Philippines)
 HSE National Ambulance Service of Ireland 
 National Apprenticeship Service, UK
 National Archives of Scotland, Edinburgh
 National Association of Scholars, US
 Former National Association of Schoolmasters, UK
 National Association of Seadogs, a Nigerian confraternity
 National Audubon Society, US conservancy organization
 National Autistic Society, UK
National Salvation Front (South Sudan), a militant group
 Nautical Archaeology Society, UK
 Nord Anglia International School Dubai

People
 Lil Nas X (born 1999), American rapper
 Nas Majeed, contestant on the sixth series of Love Island
 Digital Nas (born 1998), American record producer
 Mehmet Nas (born 1979), Turkish footballer
 Nesrin Nas (born 1958), Turkish academic
 Nuseir Yassin (born 1992), Arab-Israeli Vlogger, creator of Nas Daily

Places
 Lynden Pindling International Airport (IATA airport code NAS), near Nassau, Bahamas
 Nas (Ikaria), a village in the Greek island of Icaria

Religion
 al-Nas, Islamic scriptural chapter in the Quran
 New American Standard Bible, a 1971 English translation of the Bible
 Nordic Asa-Community (Swedish: Nordiska Asa-samfundet), a neopagan organisation in Sweden

Science and technology
 National Academy of Sciences (disambiguation)

Biology, chemistry and medicine
 N-Acetylserotonin, also known as normelatonin, a neurotransmitter
 NaS battery, a sodium–sulfur battery
 Neonatal abstinence syndrome, a drug withdrawal syndrome found in infants that have been administered drugs
 Normative Aging Study, a long-term study of the health effects of aging
 Nucleophilic acyl substitution, a reaction in organic chemistry
 Nucleophilic aromatic substitution, a reaction in organic chemistry

Computing and networks
 NASA Advanced Supercomputing Division
 NetWare Access Server, a Novell product
 Network access server
 Network-attached storage
 Neural architecture search
 Non-access stratum, in wireless networking

Other uses
 National account system, for measuring the economic activity of a nation
 Nerve attenuation syndrome, a fictional disease in the movie Johnny Mnemonic

See also
 Naas (disambiguation)
 Nass (disambiguation)
 Naz (disambiguation)

Turkish-language surnames